A kugel fountain (also called a floating sphere fountain or by the pleonasmic name kugel ball) is a water feature or sculpture where a sphere sits in a fitted hollow in a pedestal, and is supported by aquaplaning on a thin film of water. Pressurized water flows between the sphere and socket, creating a mechanical hydrostatic bearing that is nearly frictionless. The sphere can weigh thousands of kilograms, but the efficient bearing allows it to be spun by the force of a hand. The sphere does not float, being denser than water; it is often made from granite. The hydraulics of the fountain can be controlled so that the axis of rotation of the sphere changes continually. Ring sculptures that rotate on an axis are also built.

Kugel fountains can be found all over the world. Many are at popular tourist destinations, such as science museums, shopping centers, lobbies, and gardens.

The term kugel is from the German word Kugel for ball or sphere.

Locations of kugel fountains

Notes

Gallery

See also 
 Aquaplaning
 Fluid bearing
 Lubrication theory
 Stone ball
 Stone spheres of Costa Rica

References

External links 

  
 Kugel fountain FAQ
 Terracache dedicated to the kugel fountain.
 Waymarking list of large kugel fountains, with GPS coordinates and images.

Balls
Fountains
Garden ornaments
Outdoor sculptures